The Pacific International Cup (PIC) is an international bonspiel held annually in April at the Richmond Curling Club in Richmond, British Columbia. The objective of the PIC is to promote and develop curling at a grass-roots level both in British Columbia and internationally by providing club teams an opportunity to play in a premier international tournament.  Over the years teams from 23 different countries and US states have participated in the bonspiel, including from China, Chinese Taipei, South Korea, Japan, Australia, New Zealand, Brazil, and Singapore.

The PIC invites 16 men's teams and 16 women's teams, 13 each from outside of British Columbia (Yukon and international) and the top 3 teams from the BC Club Challenge Championship.

History 
Originally called the Pacific Club Challenge, the inaugural event was held in 1999 at the Royal City Curling Club in New Westminster, British Columbia. At that time it was only open to the men's club champions from the Lower Mainlands division of the Pacific Coast Curling Association (one of the precursors to the current Curl BC association).  Over time the club challenge was opened to all of the Pacific Coast Curling Association (and subsequently Curl BC) and acted as a provincial club championship. In 2019 the BC Club Challenge became a separate event where club champions from each curling club in the province have a chance to become provincial club champion and represent British Columbia at the national Travelers Curling Club Championship. The top 3 men's and women's teams in the BC Club Challenge Championship gain entry into the Pacific International Cup.

In 2000 the bonspiel expanded to include international and Yukon teams and in 2004 added a women's division.  From 2012 to 2018 both men's and women's had two pools, the international pool and the British Columbia pool which acted as the provincial club challenge championship. The winners of each pool would then play each other to become the men's and women's overall PIC champions.

In March, 2019 Curling Canada honoured the organizers of the Pacific International Cup with the prestigious Award of Achievement in recognition of the event's impact on curling.

The 2020 PIC was cancelled due to the COVID-19 pandemic.

Champions

References

External links 

 Official website

Curling in British Columbia
Curling competitions in Canada
International curling competitions hosted by Canada
Sports competitions in British Columbia